McNeal "Awra" Briguela (born March 26, 2004), also known by his stage name Awra Briguela, is a Filipino comedian. He gained recognition when he starred in FPJ's Ang Probinsyano (2016–2019), personally chosen for the role by the show's lead actor Coco Martin. Briguela's life was featured in a titular  episode of Maalaala Mo Kaya in 2016. 
In 2017, he was declared champion in the first season of the Filipino version of Your Face Sounds Familiar: Kids (season 1).

Personal life
Briguela has been openly gay since childhood, and is fond of impersonating Filipina actresses like Sarah Geronimo, Sarah Lahbati, and his idol Maja Salvador, who was one of his co-casts in FPJ's Ang Probinsyano. He popularized his screen name "Awra" upon achieving mainstream recognition as an actor and comedian.

Career
Briguela started his career off as an internet sensation.  Briguela became known to his parents for impersonating actress such as Sarah Geronimo and Sarah Lahbati. He was discovered by actor, Coco Martin, who personally saw his as a chance in his primetime television series FPJ's Ang Probinsyano (2016–2019), a remake of the 1997 film of the same title and name. Briguela gained widespread for his role as "MakMak" and the series was produced by Dreamscape Entertainment Television, who created many successful pictures such as Doble Kara, Ina, Kapatid, Anak, and Till I Met You. Briguela starred in the series opposite Coco Martin, Susan Roces, Maja Salvador, Bela Padilla, Albert Martinez, Arjo Atayde, Eddie Garcia, Agot Isidro, Jaime Fabregas, and Simon "Onyok" Pineda, who played the role of Onyok. Briguela won a 3rd Aral Parangal Awards for Best Child Performer, which she won twice, for the primetime series.

His life was featured in an episode of Maalaala Mo Kaya, playing as himself alongside Aleck Bovick and Janus del Prado who played his mother and father respectively. He made his feature film debut in the Super Parental Guardians (2016) where he portrayed the role of Megan Gaspar alongside fellow Ang Probinsyano actors Coco Martin, Onyok Pineda and Vice Ganda. Briguela later participated as a contestant in Your Face Sounds Familiar: Kids (season 1).

Discography

Singles

Filmography

Films

Drama series

TV shows

Online shows

Accolades

See also 
 Onyok Pineda
 Coco Martin
 Vice Ganda

References

External links 
 

Living people
2004 births
Filipino gay actors
21st-century Filipino male actors
Filipino male child actors
Star Magic
Male actors from Manila
People from Las Piñas
Tagalog people
Film male child actors
Television male child actors
Filipino male comedians
21st-century Filipino LGBT people